Certain abbreviations are current within the profession of optometry. They are used to denote clinical conditions, examination techniques and findings, and various forms of treatment.

Eye examination terms

Clinical conditions terms

Contact lens terms

Pharmacy and drug terms

Examination types and enhanced care schemes

External links 
 The College of Optometrists Members' Handbook (PDF)
 theOptom.com
 Optometry Acronyms and Abbreviations

Optometry
Optometry